Zwigato is a 2022 Indian Hindi-language drama film directed by Nandita Das. The film is produced by Applause Entertainment and Nandita Das Initiatives. The film presents a story of the relentlessness of life. Kapil Sharma and Shahana Goswami star as the leads in the film. The film has been debuted in the Toronto Worldwide Film Celebration, 2022. The film was theatrically released on 17 March   2023.

Plot
The film, set in current times in Bhubaneswar, explores the life of Manas an ex-factory floor manager. After losing his job, he is forced to work as a food delivery rider, grappling with the app on his phone and the world of ratings and incentives. He struggles to make ends meet for his wife, Pratima, his two children, and an ailing mother. Simultaneously, Pratima a homemaker, begins to explore different work opportunities to support his income. From being a masseuse for rich women to a cleaner at a mall. The fears of these new experiences are coupled with the joys of a newfound independence.

Cast
 Kapil Sharma as Manas 
 Shahana Goswami as Pratima
 Gul Panag
 Sayani Gupta
 Swanand Kirkire

Production
Kapil Sharma's starrer Zwigato film is made on the budget of Rs. 10-15 Crores appox.

The movie has been extensively shot and set in Bhubaneswar- the Capital city of Odisha, also the city that the director hails from. This provides a unique local flavour to the film. A lot of secondary artist were locals.

Soundtrack 
The music of the film is composed by Hitesh Sonik. lyrics are written by Devanshu And Geet.

Release

Festivals

 The film had its world premiere at the Toronto International Film Festival at the ‘Contemporary World Cinema section’. – Sept 2022
 The Film had its Asian premiere at the Busan International Film Festival at ‘A Window of Asian Cinema’ – Oct 2022
 Zwigato was the opening film of the ‘Kaleidoscope section’ at the International Film Festival of Kerala. – Dec 2022.

Reception

Critical reception 
Anna MM Vetticad in Firstpost wrote "Zwigato is a film of unassuming depth and unobtrusive commentary. Why on earth didn’t someone make this before?"

Saibal Chatterjee of NDTV wrote "Unpretentious but unfailingly pertinent. Zwigato hits home with equal measures of power and pathos."

SR Praveen from The Hindu wrote, "Deftly weaved. A poignant story of the new working class."

Box office 
The film collected  on it's opening day. The film collected  in the first weekend.

References

External links 
 

Indian drama films
2020s Hindi-language films